The Bishop of Swansea was an episcopal title used by a suffragan bishop of the Diocese of St David's, in the Church of England Province of Canterbury until 1920 and then in the Church in Wales.It took its name after the town of Swansea, then in Glamorganshire; since the erection of the Diocese of Swansea and Brecon in 1923, the title has been united to the diocesan Bishop of Swansea and Brecon.

List of bishops

See also

 Swansea

References

 
Swansea
Swansea, Bishop of
Swansea
Swansea